Group A of the 2000 African Cup of Nations ran from 23 January until 2 February. It consisted of Gabon, South Africa, Algeria and DR Congo. The matches were held in Accra and Kumasi in Ghana. South Africa and Algeria progressed to the quarterfinals.

Standings

Ghana vs. Cameroon

Algeria vs. DR Congo

DR Congo vs. South Africa

Gabon vs. Algeria

Gabon vs. DR Congo

Algeria vs. South Africa

External links
RSSSF page

2000 African Cup of Nations